France is a country whose territory consists of metropolitan France in western Europe, as well as several overseas regions and territories. A member of the Group of 7 (formerly G8) leading industrialised countries, it is ranked as the world's ninth-largest and the EU's second-largest economy by purchasing power parity. With 31 of the 500 biggest companies in the world in 2015, France ranks fourth in the Fortune Global 500, ahead of Germany and the UK. According to the World Trade Organization (WTO), in 2009 France was the world's sixth-largest exporter and the fourth-largest importer of manufactured goods.

French companies have maintained key positions in the insurance and banking industries: Axa is the world's largest insurance company. The leading French banks are BNP Paribas and the Crédit agricole, ranking as the world's largest and sixth-largest banks in 2010 (by assets), while the Société Générale group was ranked the world's eighth-largest in 2009.

For further information on the types of business entities in this country and their abbreviations, see "Business entities in France".

Largest firms 

This list shows firms in the Fortune Global 500, which ranks firms by total revenues reported before 31 March 2017. Only the top five firms (if available) are included as a sample.

Notable firms 
This list includes notable companies with primary headquarters located in the country. The industry and sector follow the Industry Classification Benchmark taxonomy. Organizations which have ceased operations are included and noted as defunct.

See also 
 Indices of French companies
 CAC 40
 CAC Next 20
 CAC Small
 CAC All-Tradable
 SBF 120
 Euronext – the major French stock market

References 

France